"L'Amour s'en va" ("Love goes away") is a song created and performed by French singer-songwriter and actress Françoise Hardy. The song is 's representative in the Eurovision Song Contest 1963, covered in other languages, and in 1963 gained chart success in Belgium and won France's prestigious award Grand Prix du Disque. Some fifty years after its original release the song holds as one of Hardy's signature tunes.

Background
Hardy had had her breakthrough as an 18-year-old in late 1962 with the yé-yé hit "Tous les garçons et les filles" and she would go on to become one of the Francophone world's most successful and popular artists of the 1960s – as well as an influential fashion icon.

Style and lyrics 
"L'Amour s'en va" is a slow-paced chanson, a style popular in France and Europe in the 1960s as well the early days of the Eurovision Song Contest. Under the song's title which means "love goes away", Hardy sings about a relationship which is conducted in the knowledge that love is a fleeting thing – however this does not seem to matter to either of the lovers involved, as they "chase after it".

Hardy recorded an Italian version as "L'amore va" and a German one as "Die Liebe geht".

Eurovision Song Contest
The song was performed fifteenth on the night, following 's Jacques Raymond with "Waarom?" and preceding 's Nana Mouskouri with "À force de prier". At the close of voting, it had received 25 points, placing 5th in a field of 16.

The song is included in a compilation album of French-language Eurovision Song Contest entries, titled "Eurovision: Les plus belles chansons françaises", released in 2000.

It was succeeded as Monegasque representative at the 1964 contest by Romuald with "Où sont-elles passées".

Charts
"L'Amour s'en va" entered Belgium's two main charts in 1963, the official French-Belgian on 1 April until 1 September spanning 24 weeks, and the official Flemish-Belgian on 1 June 1963 where it spanned four weeks.

Weekly charts

References

External links
 Official Eurovision Song Contest site, history by year, 1963
 Detailed info and lyrics, The Diggiloo Thrush, "L'Amour s'en va".
 Radio France Internationale, biography Françoise Hardy

Françoise Hardy songs
Eurovision songs of Monaco
Eurovision songs of 1963
1963 songs
Disques Vogue singles
1963 singles
Songs written by Françoise Hardy

Number-one singles in Sweden